is a Kitakyushu monorail station in Kokura Kita ward, Kitakyushu, Japan.

History
The station opened on 9 January 1985.

Station layout
The elevated station has two side platforms with two tracks.

Platforms

References

Railway stations in Japan opened in 1985